Mauri Vansevenant (born 1 June 1999) is a Belgian cyclist, who currently rides for UCI WorldTeam . He is the son of former professional cyclist Wim Vansevenant, and is named after Melcior Mauri, the winner of the 1991 Vuelta a España.

Major results

2017
 4th Grand Prix Bob Jungels
2018
 5th Piccolo Giro di Lombardia
 10th Overall Giro della Valle d'Aosta
1st  Young rider classification
2019
 1st  Overall Giro della Valle d'Aosta
1st  Young rider classification
 4th Overall Orlen Nations Grand Prix
 5th Overall Grand Prix Priessnitz spa
 6th Overall Tour de l'Avenir
2020
 1st Stage 1b (TTT) Settimana Internazionale di Coppi e Bartali
2021
 1st GP Industria & Artigianato di Larciano
 3rd Trofeo Laigueglia
 7th Overall Settimana Internazionale di Coppi e Bartali
 8th Overall Tour de la Provence
2022
 2nd Overall Okolo Slovenska
 2nd Faun-Ardèche Classic
 5th Overall Deutschland Tour
 8th Overall Vuelta a Andalucía
 8th Overall Tour de l'Ain
2023
 2nd Overall Tour of Oman
1st Stage 5

Grand Tour general classification results timeline

References

External links
 
 
 
 
 
 
 

1999 births
Living people
Belgian male cyclists
Sportspeople from Ostend
Cyclists from West Flanders
Olympic cyclists of Belgium
Cyclists at the 2020 Summer Olympics
21st-century Belgian people